The King's Highway Historic District covers the portions of U.S. Route 206 and New Jersey Route 27 in New Jersey that connect Lawrenceville (in Lawrence Township) with Kingston (in Franklin Township / South Brunswick, New Jersey) through Princeton.  This historic roadway dates to colonial times and was a portion of the King's Highway that was laid out by order of Charles II of England to connect Boston with Charleston.  It is lined with many institutions and sites that have played an important role in the History of the United States, including Princeton University and the Princeton Theological Seminary.

Along the road can be found five National Historic Landmarks: the Lawrenceville School, Morven, Maclean House, Nassau Hall, and the Joseph Henry House.  The highway also runs through eight historic districts, from west to east, Lawrence Township Historic District, Princeton Battlefield / Stony Brook Village Historic District, Princeton Historic District, Jugtown Historic District, Kingston Mill Historic District, Lake Carnegie Historic District, Delaware and Raritan Canal Historic District and the Kingston Village Historic District.  The governor's mansion of New Jersey, Drumthwacket, independently listed on the National Register of Historic Places, is found on the road in the western part of Princeton. The district was added to the National Register of Historic Places on December 21, 2000 for its significance in commerce, exploration, settlement, military, politics, government and transportation from 1660 to 1950. The highway itself is the only contributing structure.

Gallery

See also

Assunpink Trail
National Register of Historic Places listings in Mercer County, New Jersey
National Register of Historic Places listings in Middlesex County, New Jersey
National Register of Historic Places listings in Somerset County, New Jersey

References

Historic districts on the National Register of Historic Places in New Jersey
Historic districts in Princeton, New Jersey
National Register of Historic Places in Mercer County, New Jersey
National Register of Historic Places in Middlesex County, New Jersey
National Register of Historic Places in Somerset County, New Jersey
Lawrence Township, Mercer County, New Jersey
Franklin Township, Somerset County, New Jersey
South Brunswick, New Jersey
New Jersey Register of Historic Places